Urânia is a municipality in the state of São Paulo, Brazil. The city has a population of 9,120 inhabitants and an area of 208.9 km².

Urânia belongs to the Mesoregion of São José do Rio Preto.

References

Municipalities in São Paulo (state)